was a monthly Japanese shōnen manga magazine published on the 12th each month by Earth Star Entertainment since 12 March 2011. The magazine announced in their November 2014 issue that the print version would cease publication, and instead be replaced by a new, all-digital version after the release of the December 2014 issue on 12 November.

Serialized titles
Alice Royale
Ataraxia - Sengoku Tenseiki
Chotto Matta!! Jisatsu Café
D.C. III
Devil Survivor 2 - Show Your Free Will
Didn't I Say to Make My Abilities Average in the Next Life?! (ongoing)
Dōnano Kawamoto-san!
Dracu-Riot! Honey!
Encouragement of Climb (ongoing)
Enka to Hanamichi
Heart Under the Blade
Kai Pilgrim
Kemonogumi
Koetama
Koigoe
Magical Chef Shōjo Shizuru
Mahou Shoujo Nante Mouiidesukara (ongoing)
Majokko Minami-kun no Jijō
Mangirl!
Material Brave
Morenja V
My Daughter Left the Nest and Returned an S-Rank Adventurer (ongoing)
My Instant Death Ability Is So Overpowered, No One in This Other World Stands a Chance Against Me! (ongoing)
Nadeshikoka.
Neun Edda
Nijiiro Septetta
Nobunagun 
Nya Nya Nya Nya!
Photo Kano - Memorial Pictures
Pupa
Record
Reincarnated as a Dragon's Egg: Dragon Road of Ibara (ongoing)
Sekai de Ichiban Tsuyoku Naritai!
Super Sonico Soni Koma
Takamiya Nasuno Desu! (cancelled)
Teekyu (ongoing)
Tokyo Jitensha Shōjo.
Trace (Amematsu)
Usakame (ongoing)
Water Cube
Zansatsu Hantō Akamemura
Zenryoku Idol!

References

External links
Comic Earth Star official website 

2011 establishments in Japan
2014 establishments in Japan
Defunct magazines published in Japan
 
Magazines established in 2011
Magazines disestablished in 2014
Magazines published in Tokyo
Monthly manga magazines published in Japan
Online magazines with defunct print editions
Shōnen manga magazines